Family is the second album by Think About Life, released on May 26, 2009.

In a favourable review, critic Ben Rayner singled out the songs "Johanna" ("think digital-age Sly & The Family Stone") and "Sofa-bed", "which sounds like TV on the Radio with a clearer sense of melody."

Track listing
"Johanna"
"Havin' My Baby"
"Sweet Sixteen"
"Young Hearts"
"Wizzzard"
"Set You On Fire"
"Sofa-bed"
"The Veldt"
"Nueva Nueva"
"Life Of Crime"

Personnel
Martin Cesar – Vox/Beats
Graham Van Pelt – Guitar/Vox/Sequences/Sounds
Matt Shane – Drums/Vox

References 

Think About Life albums
2009 albums
Alien8 Recordings albums